Simbarashe Gupo (born 7 July 1989) is a Zimbabwean first-class cricketer who plays for Mashonaland Eagles.

References

External links
 

1989 births
Living people
Zimbabwean cricketers
Mashonaland Eagles cricketers
Sportspeople from Kadoma, Zimbabwe